Lorraine Kutcher (born 29 January 1938 in Sunshine, Victoria, Australia) is an Australian former cricket player.

Kutcher played four tests for the Australia national women's cricket team.

References

1938 births
Australia women Test cricketers
Living people
Cricketers from Melbourne
People from Sunshine, Victoria